Tennessee elected its members August 1–2, 1811.

See also 
 United States House of Representatives elections, 1810 and 1811
 List of United States representatives from Tennessee

1811
Tennessee
United States House of Representatives